Kuyuluk is a village in the District of Kozan, Adana Province, Turkey. In a 2011 census it had a population of 367 people, with 174 men and 193 women.

References

Villages in Kozan District